Talu may refer to:

People
 Çiğdem Talu, Turkish pop music songwriter
 Naim Talu, Turkish economist, banker, and politician
 Wang Talu, Taiwanese actor

Places
 Talu, Tibet
 Khao Ok Talu, mountain located in Phatthalung Province, Thailand
 Talu Na Mohra, town in the Islamabad Capital Territory of Pakistan
 Talu, West Pasaman, a village (kelurahan) in West Pasaman Regency, West Sumatra, Indonesia
 Talu, Bhiwani, a village in the Indian state of Haryana
 Talu, Iran (disambiguation), places in Iran
 Talu, Wanquan in Wanquan, Honghu, Jingzhou, Hubei, China